Fábio Alves da Silva is the name of:

Fábio Alves (footballer, born 1988), Brazilian footballer
Fábio Bilica (born 1979), Brazilian footballer